The Edmond de Rothschild Foundation (Israel) is a philanthropic foundation founded in Israel by the Rothschild family.

The Foundation operates within the framework of the international network of the Edmond de Rothschild Foundations around the world and continues the path of the Rothschild family's philanthropic heritage for more than 130 years. 
The Foundation fulfills the Rothschild family's longstanding commitment to the pioneering spirit of the State of Israel and invests in agents of change and advancement of its new pioneers. The Foundation initiates dozens of innovative projects throughout Israel aimed at reducing social gaps and fostering young leadership.

The fundamental of the Foundation's goals is the aspiration to create a just, cohesive and shared Israeli society that drives deep processes of social change and promotes excellence, diversity and leadership through higher education. 
The Foundation works to maximize higher education in as many communities as possible, to promote innovative academic research, to engage artists in social involvement, to invest in groundbreaking economic-social models, and to foster young and committed leadership.

History 
 
The Edmond de Rothschild Foundation (IL) was founded by the Baron Edmond de Rothschild, the grandson of Edmond James de Rothschild. While his grandfather made his mark on land acquisition, Baron Edmond de Rothschild will be remembered for his contribution to the industrialization of the Land of Israel and his generous contributions to educational and cultural institutions.
 
At the end of the 1950's, the Rothschild family transferred the Caesarea land (some ) to the Edmond the Rothschild Foundation (IL) and invited the state to be a partner in the Foundation. The model according to which the foundation operates is a unique model whereby all the proceeds from the development of the Caesarea community are transferred from the subsidiaries of The Edmond de Rothschild Foundation (IL), the Caesarea Development Corporation and the Caesarea Properties Corporation to the foundation, which contributes to the advancement of education and higher education in Israel.
 
When Baron Edmond de Rothschild died in 1997, the banking and philanthropic foundations of the family moved to his son Baron Benjamin de Rothschild. Baron Benjamin de Rothschild and his wife, Baroness Ariane de Rothschild, are involved and lead the Edmond de Rothschild Foundation (IL) in Israel as part of the Edmond de Rothschild Foundation's network of educators in the world.

The Foundation Vision
The Edmond de Rothschild Foundation (Israel) exemplifies the Rothschild family's long-standing commitment to the pioneering spirit of the State of Israel. 
As part of a tradition of more than 130 years, the Edmond de Rothschild Foundation (IL) has pioneered a philanthropic vision that focuses on building a cohesive society by narrowing the social gap and promoting excellence, diversity and leadership through higher education.

The Foundation seeks to motivate social change processes through dozens of projects across the country that provide opportunities for empowerment for many communities in Israel. The Foundation leads, develops and supports social entrepreneurship and works to achieve higher education, entrepreneurship, art and academic research.

The Foundation Operation Fields

To realize its vision, the Edmond de Rothschild Foundation (IL) operates in five areas: in order to narrow gaps in Israeli society by promoting social mobility of young people from peripheral populations by acquiring higher education and translating it into suitable employment.

 Ensuring access to and success in higher education - towards narrowing the gaps in Israeli society, by advancing social mobility among young people from peripheral populations through the acquisition of higher education and its translation into commensurate employment.
 Academic Excellence - towards fostering the next generation of researchers, promoting innovative research, and contributing to the development of professionalism and excellence in philanthropy.
 The arts - towards promoting social impact and involvement through art, cultivating excellence, and upholding a long-standing family tradition of supporting the arts.
 Impact Entrepreneurship - with the goal of creating a measurable business model and encouraging the flow of new funds which would address social and environmental needs.
 Leadership - towards establishing a reserve of young leaders, who will integrate into positions of influence in Israeli society and act to promote social issues. The leadership programs are run by the Edmond De Rothschild Partnerships.
The Edmond de Rothschild Partnerships, established in 2016, strives to reduce disparity in Israeli society and to provide opportunities for youth from socio-geographic peripheries. The organization was set up to create one roof for youth and young adult leadership programs, with the aim of establishing the next generation of Israeli leaders based on social worldviews and humanistic principles – reducing social gaps, promoting equal opportunities, solidarity and mutual respect.

Board of Governors
Today, Baron Benjamin de Rothschild and his wife, Baroness Ariane de Rothschild, are involved and lead the activities of the Edmond de Rothschild Foundation (IL) in Israel. On 1 June 2019, Michael Kliger was appointed Deputy Chairman of the Edmond de Rothschild Foundation (IL).

The Board of Governors of the Foundation consists of representatives of the Rothschild family and representatives of the Board of the state.

Donations 
The scope of donations has increased over the years, so that in 2015 the amount of donations amounted to about 32 million NIS and in 2018 the volume of donations increased to 86 million NIS.

Agreement with the State
In June 2018 an agreement was signed between the State of Israel, the Rothschild House and the Edmond de Rothschild Foundation (IL), according to which the parties agreed to extend the cooperation agreement between them until 2032, ten years from the end of the previous agreement period. 
As part of the agreement, the Edmond de Rothschild Foundation (IL) will contribute approximately NIS 1 billion over the next three years to promote joint national projects for the Foundation and the State of Israel in the area of higher education.

The Caesarea Development Corporation

The Caesarea Development Corporation acts as the agent of The Edmond de Rothschild Foundation, continues the philanthropic path of the Rothschild family. 
In the 1960's, the company was entrusted with the realization of the vision of Baron Edmond Benjamin de Rothschild to turn Caesarea into a unique settlement and center of tourism, leisure and recreation in the country by investing in the development of the land for residential, industrial and tourism purposes. All the proceeds are transferred to The Edmond de Rothschild Foundation.

Caesarea Assets Corporation

The Caesarea Assets Corporation is working to improve and realize the land and properties of the Foundation, including the Caesarea Industrial Park.
The Caesarea Assets Corporation has set up a goal to build, rent and manage income-producing real estate in the industrial and business park in Caesarea, and over the years the company has built over 80,000 square meters of properties under its ownership.

References

External links
 The Edmond de Rothschild Foundation (Israel) Website
 Baroness Rothschild Wants Israel To Be Less Dependent On Charitable Grants, (2014) Gil Tanenbaum, thejewishnews.com
 How Foreign Donors Reshaped Israel: A Who's Who, (2013) Shuki Sadeh, Haaretz.com
 Edmond De Rothschild Partnerships Website



Foundations based in Israel
Edmond Adolphe de Rothschild